is a Japanese racing driver who last competed in the NASCAR Camping World Truck Series, driving the No. 33 Toyota Tundra for Reaume Brothers Racing. Miura previously competed in the Asian Formula 3 Series and the NASCAR Whelen Euro Series. Miura has competed in a total of 22 Euro Elite 1 races since 2017 and in 17 Euro Elite 2 races between 2017 and 2018. He won the 2018 Challenger's Trophy over Dario Caso.

Motorsports career results

NASCAR

Camping World Truck Series
(key) (Bold – Pole position awarded by qualifying time. Italics – Pole position earned by points standings or practice time. * – Most laps led.)

Whelen Euro Series – Elite 1
(key) (Bold – Pole position. Italics – Fastest lap. * – Most laps led. ^ – Most positions gained)

Whelen Euro Series - EuroNASCAR 2
(key) (Bold – Pole position. Italics – Fastest lap. * – Most laps led. ^ – Most positions gained)

References

External links
 

1979 births
Living people
Japanese racing drivers
NASCAR drivers
Asian Formula Three Championship drivers